Ross 695, also known as Gliese 465, is a red dwarf star in the constellation Corvus. At apparent magnitude 11.27, it is much too faint to be seen with the unaided eye. A small star, it has around 23% the mass and radius of the Sun, but only 0.7% its luminosity. Investigation of its radial velocity failed to find any evidence of a planetary companion.

References

Corvus (constellation)
M-type main-sequence stars
0465
060559